Pineapple Press is a niche publisher in Florida. Its catalogue includes non-fiction titles such as "Baseball in Florida" and "Florida's Birds" (a reference book with artwork by Karl Karalus) as well as compilations such as "Cracker literature", books on historic homes, lighthouses, Gulf Coast islands, and fiction including historical novels from Patrick D. Smith and a mystery by Virginia Lanier ("Death in Bloodhound Red" set in Georgia's Okefenokee Swamp). Pineapple also publishes works by Marjory Stoneman Douglas. The publisher adds approximately 12–14 titles a year. The "hits" sell 3,000 or 4,000 copies annually adding up to total revenue of about $1 million for the publisher annually. It is run by June and David Cussen. Some books have been optioned for movies. Pineapple Press was acquired by Rowman & Littlefield in 2018 and became an imprint of Globe Pequot Press.

Other titles
Florida's First People: 12,000 Years of Human History by Robin C. Brown, a Dr. in Fort Myers who also authored Florida's Fossils

References

External links

Book publishing companies based in Florida
Companies based in Sarasota, Florida
1982 establishments in Florida
American companies established in 1982
Publishing companies established in 1982